Tega Ikoba (born August 14, 2003), is an American soccer player who plays as a forward for Major League Soccer club Portland Timbers.

Club career
After playing with the Portland Timbers academy from 2018, Ikoba appeared for Portland's USL Championship side Portland Timbers 2 on September 2, 2020, as a 57th-minute substitute in a 2–1 loss to Sacramento Republic.

On January 11, 2022, Ikoba signed for the Portland Timbers as a Homegrown Player.

Ikoba made his MLS debut on May 14, 2022 against Sporting KC.

Personal life
Born in the United States, Ikoba is of Nigerian descent.

References

External links
 
 North Carolina profile

2003 births
Living people
Association football forwards
American soccer players
American sportspeople of Nigerian descent
People from Bettendorf, Iowa
Portland Timbers 2 players
Soccer players from Iowa
USL Championship players
Portland Timbers players
North Carolina Tar Heels men's soccer players
Homegrown Players (MLS)
MLS Next Pro players
Major League Soccer players